Aristoteles is a lunar impact crater that lies near the southern edge of the Mare Frigoris and to the east of the Montes Alpes mountain range. It was officially named in 1935 after the ancient Greek philosopher Aristotle by the International Astronomical Union, using the classical form of his name.

To the immediate south of Aristoteles lies the slightly smaller crater Eudoxus, and these two form a distinctive pair for a telescope observer. An arc of mountains between these craters bends to the west before joining the walls. The smaller crater Mitchell is directly attached to the eastern rim of Aristoteles. To the west is the low, flooded feature Egede.

Observers have noted the crater wall of Aristoteles is slightly distorted into a rounded hexagon shape. The inner walls are wide and finely terraced. The outer ramparts display a generally radial structure of hillocks through the extensive blanket of ejecta. The crater floor is uneven and covered in hilly ripples. Aristoteles does possess small central peaks but they are somewhat offset to the south. The interior floor appears to have been filled with a layer of material partially burying these projections.

Satellite craters
By convention these features are identified on lunar maps by placing the letter on the side of the crater midpoint that is closest to Aristoteles.

References

External links

 
 

Impact craters on the Moon